Oleg Alexandrovich Troyanovsky (24 November 1919 – 21 December 2003) was ambassador of the Soviet Union to Japan and China and was the Soviet Permanent Representative to the United Nations (from 1976 to 1986).

Troyanovsky was born into a diplomatic family.  His father, Alexander A. Troyanovsky, served as the first Soviet ambassador to the United States from 1934 to 1938 and was also Soviet Ambassador to Japan from 1929 to 1932. Although he was born in Moscow, Oleg attended The American School in Japan; the Sidwell Friends School in Washington, DC; and Swarthmore College in Pennsylvania.  At Swarthmore in the 1930s, Troyanovsky allegedly recruited his American classmate Stephen Laird as a Soviet spy.

Troyanovsky returned to the Soviet Union to complete his education at the Moscow Institute for Foreign Languages and Moscow University. After spending two years as a soldier in the Red Army, Troyanovsky joined the Soviet Foreign Ministry to work as a foreign policy assistant and interpreter for Soviet leader Joseph Stalin and adviser to Nikita Khrushchev.

Troyanovsky served as the Soviet ambassador to Japan before he was appointed to the United Nations. In 1980, two members of a dissident Marxist group sneaked into the UN Security Council chamber and threw red paint on Troyanovsky and US Ambassador William vanden Heuvel. The Soviet responded, "Better red than dead." In 1983, when listening to the recording of Soviet fighter pilots shooting down Korean Air Flight 007 jumbo jet near Moneron Island that killed carrying 269 people, Troyanovsky remained poker-faced and impassive.

From 1986 to 1990, he held his final diplomatic post as the ambassador to China. Troyanovsky spent his retirement years working on his memoirs and giving lectures in Russia and abroad.

References

External links
Obituary, from the Boston Globe
 Interview with Oleg Troyanovsky
 wilsoncenter.org

1919 births
2003 deaths
Ambassadors of the Soviet Union to China
Ambassadors of the Soviet Union to Japan
Communist Party of the Soviet Union members
Diplomats from Moscow
Permanent Representatives of the Soviet Union to the United Nations
Swarthmore College alumni
American School in Japan alumni